David Harold Monahan (born August 13, 1971) is an American actor, best known for recurring roles on Crossing Jordan as Detective Matt Seely and Dawson's Creek as Tobey Barret.  He has also appeared in such films as The Last Supper (2000), The Mostly Unfabulous Social Life of Ethan Green (2005) and Something New (2006). He also appeared in the Supernatural episode "Houses of the Holy".

Monahan was born in North Olmsted, Ohio. A 1989 graduate of Bishop O'Connell High School (in Arlington County, Virginia), Monahan graduated from Harvard University with an honor degree in government.

Monahan's husband is actor Larry Sullivan; they have one adopted child together. The couple was  featured in a Campbell's Soup ad released in 2015.

Filmography

References

External links

1971 births
Harvard University alumni
Living people
People from North Olmsted, Ohio
American gay actors
21st-century LGBT people
American male television actors
American male film actors